The 1936 North Dakota gubernatorial election was held on November 3, 1936. Nonpartisan League nominee William Langer defeated incumbent Republican Walter Welford with 35.80% of the vote.

Primary elections
Primary elections were held on June 24, 1936.

Democratic primary

Candidates
John Moses, former Mercer County State's Attorney
Ole H. Olson, former Governor
James F. Morrow

Results

Republican primary

Candidates
Walter Welford, incumbent Governor
William Langer, former Governor

Results

General election

Candidates
Major party candidates
William Langer, Nonpartisan League
Walter Welford, Republican
John Moses, Democratic

Other candidates
Pat J. Barrett, Communist
L. J. Wehe, Progressive

Results

References

1936
North Dakota
Gubernatorial